"I Know What Boys Like" is a song written by guitarist Chris Butler in 1978, while he was still a member of the rock band Tin Huey.

It was recorded by Butler and released as a single in 1980, but beyond some club success, it did not appear on any charts. When he formed the band The Waitresses, with Patty Donahue as lead vocalist, the band recorded the song for its debut album, Wasn't Tomorrow Wonderful?, released by Polydor Records in 1982.

Charts
"I Know What Boys Like" was released as a single from the album and peaked at number 62 the week of May 29, 1982 on the Billboard Hot 100.

Appearances in pop culture
The Waitresses' version of the song appeared on the soundtrack of the 1987 film I Was a Teenage Zombie.
The song was also used in an episode of Lucy, the Daughter of the Devil.
VH1 named the song the 82nd greatest one-hit wonder of all-time in 2002 as well as the 34th greatest one-hit wonder of the 1980s in 2009.

Cover versions
A version by English female pop duo Shampoo reached No. 42 on the UK Singles Chart in September 1996.

References

1980 songs
1980 singles
1982 singles
1996 singles
The Waitresses songs
Shampoo (duo) songs
Polydor Records singles
ZE Records singles